Joan Humphreys is a former Hong Kong international lawn bowler.

Bowls career
Humphreys won double silver in the fours with Rae O'Donnell, Lena Sadick and Linda King and the team event (Taylor Trophy) at the 1981 World Outdoor Bowls Championship in Toronto.
 
She won a pairs silver medal with Rae O'Donnell at the 1987 Asia Pacific Bowls Championships in Lae.

References

Hong Kong female bowls players
Living people
Bowls World Champions
Year of birth missing (living people)